This list of locations with a subtropical climate specifically lists locations considered within the subtropics.  The subtropics are geographic and climate zones located roughly between the Tropic of Cancer and Tropic of Capricorn and the  40th parallel in both hemispheres. Subtropical climate regions can exist at high elevations within the tropics, such as across the Mexican Plateau and the Ethiopian Highlands and in Da Lat of the Vietnamese Central Highlands. These regions can also exist beyond 45 degrees poleward due to maritime influences on the NW European and Argentinian coasts, according to Trewartha.

Six climate classifications utilise the term to help define the various temperature and precipitation regions for the planet Earth. Using the Trewartha climate classification eight or more months of the year within the subtropics have an average temperature at or above . The Köppen climate classification instead classifies the warmest month above  and the coldest above  or  depending on preference. Under both classifications, at least one month must average below  or the climate is considered tropical.

Leslie Holdridge defined the subtropical climates as having a mean annual biotemperature between the frost line or critical temperature line, 16 °C to 18 °C (depending on locations in the world) and 24 °C. The frost line separates the warm temperate region from the subtropical region. It represents the dividing line between two major physiological groups of evolved plants. On the warmer side of the line, the majority of the plants are sensitive to low temperatures. They can be killed back by frosts as they have not evolved to withstand periods of cold. On the colder temperate side of the line, the total flora is adapted to survive periods of variable length of low temperatures, whether as seeds in the case of the annuals or as perennial plants which can withstand the cold. The [16 °C-18 °C] segment is often "simplified" as 17 °C (= 2(log212+0;5) ≈ 16.97 °C).

The Holdridge subtropical climates straddle more or less the warmest subtropical climates and the less warm tropical climates as defined by the Köppen-Geiger or Trewartha climate classifications.

This definition, though restricted to dry regions, is almost similar to Holdridge's.

A great portion of the world's deserts are located within the subtropics, due to the development of the subtropical ridge.  Within the humid monsoon regions in the subtropics such as Northern Vietnam (including Hanoi), a wet season is seen annually during the summer, which is when most of the yearly rainfall falls.  Within the Mediterranean climate region, the wet season occurs during the winter.  Areas bordering warm oceans are prone to locally heavy rainfall from tropical cyclones, which can contribute a significant percentage of the annual rainfall.  Plants such as date palms, citrus, mango, litchi, and avocado are grown within the subtropical zones.

This is not a complete list and is not intended to be one. Many of the higher mountains at tropical latitudes have sparsely (if at all) inhabited areas with a subtropical climate.

Africa
Only in Trewartha's classification.
Which borders on a fully tropical climate.

Algeria: Algiers, Oran, Tamanrasset
Angola: Cuíto, Huambo, Lubango, Luena, Menongue , Moçâmedes
Botswana: Francistown, Gaborone, Maun
Cape Verde: Achada Furna, Chã das Caldeiras
Chad: Tibesti Mountains
Democratic Republic of the Congo: Kolwezi, Likasi, Lubumbashi
Djibouti: Airolaf
Egypt: Alexandria, Aswan, Cairo
Eritrea: Asmara
Eswatini: Mbabane
Ethiopia: Addis Ababa, Bahir Dar, Jijiga
Kenya: Eldoret, Nairobi, Nakuru
Lesotho: Maseru
Libya: Al Jawf, Benghazi, Sabha, Tripoli
Madagascar: Antananarivo, Antsirabe, Fianarantsoa
Malawi: Dedza, Lilongwe
Mali: Taoudenni 
Mauritania: Zouérat
Mauritius: Piton de la Petite Rivière Noire
Morocco: Casablanca, Essaouira, Fez, Marrakesh, Meknes, Rabat, Tangier
Mozambique: Lichinga
Namibia: Lüderitz, Swakopmund, Walvis Bay, Windhoek
Niger: Aïr Mountains
Réunion: Interior (beaches are tropical)
São Tomé and Príncipe: Pico de São Tomé
Somalia: Erigavo
Somaliland: Hargeisa
South Africa: most of including Bloemfontein, Cape Town, Durban, Johannesburg, Kimberley, Musina, Pietermaritzburg, Port Elizabeth, and Pretoria.
South Sudan: Imatong Mountains
Sudan: Dongola
Tanzania: Arusha, Mbeya,
Tunisia: Medenine, Tunis
Uganda: Kabale 
Western Sahara: Laayoune
Zambia: Lusaka, Ndola
Zimbabwe: Bulawayo, Harare, Marondera
Islands of the European Union around the Atlantic coast of NW Africa:
Canary Islands, Spain: Las Palmas, Gran Canaria; Fuerteventura; Lanzarote; San Cristóbal de La Laguna, Tenerife; Santa Cruz de La Palma, central El Hierro
Madeira archipelago, Portugal
Ceuta, Melilla, and Plazas de soberanía, Spain.
Pantelleria and the Pelagie Islands, Italy
British islands in the South Atlantic:
Saint Helena: Longwood
Tristan da Cunha archipelago

Asia
Only in Trewartha's classification.
Which borders on a fully tropical climate..
Borderline.

Afghanistan: Herat, Jalalabad, Kandahar, Khost, Kunduz, Lashkargah, Mazar-i-Sharif
Azerbaijan: Astara, Baku, Lankaran, Mingachevir, Şirvan
Bahrain: Manama
Bangladesh: Dinajpur, Rangpur City, Saidpur
Bhutan: Thimphu
Brunei: Pagon Hill
Cambodia: Cardamom Mountains
China: Beiliu, Changsha, Chengdu, Chongqing, Dongguan, Fuzhou, Guangzhou, Guiyang, Hangzhou, Hefei, Kunming, Nanjing, Nanning, Ningbo, Shanghai, Shenzhen, Suzhou, Turpan, Wuhan, Xiamen, Yangzhou
Cyprus: Ayia Napa , Nicosia
Egypt: Sinai Peninsula
Georgia: Batumi, Kutaisi , Sukhumi (capital of Abkhazia), Zugdidi
Greece: Chios, Dodecanese Islands, Lesbos
Hong Kong: Kowloon, Wan Chai
India: Agartala, Agra, Aizawl, Allahabad, Amritsar, Bhopal, Cardamom Hills, Chandigarh, Dehradun, Delhi, Dhanbad, Dimapur, Faridabad, Gangtok, Ghaziabad, Guwahati, Imphal, Itanagar, Jaipur, Jammu, Kanpur, Kodaikanal, Kohima, Lucknow, Ludhiana, Meerut, Ooty, Patna, Ranchi, Shillong, Shimla, and Varanasi.
Iran: Ahvaz, Bandar Abbas , Bandar-e Anzali, Birjand, Bushehr, Gorgan, Ilam, Isfahan, Kashan, Kerman, Khorramabad, Qom, Rasht, Sabzevar, Sari, Saveh, Semnan, Shiraz, lower elevations of Tehran, Yazd, Zahedan
Iraq: Baghdad, Basra, Erbil, Mosul, Sulaymaniyah
Israel: Eilat, Haifa, Jerusalem, Tel Aviv
Japan: Bonin Islands, Fukuoka, Hiroshima, Izu Islands, Jōetsu, Kanazawa, Kumagaya, Maebashi, Matsuyama, Miyakojima, Nagasaki, Nagoya, Naha, Nasushiobara, Niigata , Okayama, Osaka, Sado , Tokyo, Yokohama.
Jordan: Amman, Petra
Kuwait: Kuwait City
Laos: Phongsali
Lebanon: Beirut, Tripoli
Macau: Coloane, Taipa
Malaysia: Brinchang, Cameron Highlands, Genting Highlands
Myanmar: Hakha, Lashio, Myitkyina, Putao Town, Tamu, Taunggyi
Nepal: Kathmandu, Pokhara
Northern Cyprus: North Nicosia
Oman: Saiq
Pakistan: most of (except for tropical Arabian Sea coast) including Faisalabad, Hyderabad, Islamabad, Lahore, Mardan, Multan, Muzaffarabad, Peshawar, and Quetta.
Palestinian territories: East Jerusalem, Gaza City, Nablus
Philippines: Baguio , Balbalan
Qatar: Doha
Saudi Arabia: Dammam, Dhahran, Hofuf, Jubail, Medina, Riyadh, Tabuk
South Korea: Busan, Changwon, Geochagundo, Geoje, Jeju, Tongyeong, Ulsan , Yeosu
Sri Lanka: Nuwara Eliya
Syria: Aleppo, Damascus, Homs, Latakia
Taiwan: Chiayi, Hsinchu, Taichung, Tainan, Taipei
Tajikistan: Dushanbe
Turkey: Adana, Antalya, Batman, Bursa, Gaziantep, Istanbul (also in Europe), İzmir, Mersin, Samsun, Sinop, Tekirdağ (Europe), Trabzon, Urfa
Turkmenistan: Ashgabat, Balkanabat, Mary 
United Arab Emirates: Sharjah
Uzbekistan: Bukhara, Namangan, Navoiy, Qarshi, Termez
Vietnam: Da Lat, Haiphong, Hanoi
Yemen: Hajjah, Kawkaban, Sana

Americas
Only in Trewartha's classification.
Borderline.
Borderline only in Trewartha's classification.
Which borders on a fully tropical climate.

Argentina: Extreme north to coastal Chubut Province including Buenos Aires, Comodoro Rivadavia, Mar del Plata, Mendoza, Neuquén, Rawson, Rosario, Salta, and Viedma
Bermuda
Bolivia: Cochabamba, lower elevations of La Paz, Sucre, Tarija
Brazil: Paraná, Rio Grande do Sul, Santa Catarina,  and parts of Mato Grosso do Sul and São Paulo states including the city of São Paulo. Also Petrópolis and Teresópolis in Rio de Janeiro State and highlands of Minas Gerais including Juiz de Fora and Três Corações.
Chile: North of 40°S including Antofagasta, Arica, Concepción, Juan Fernández Islands, Santiago, Valdivia , and Valparaíso.
Colombia: Bogotá, Manizales, Tunja
Costa Rica: Mount Chirripó
Ecuador: Cuenca, Latacunga, Quito, Riobamba 
El Salvador: Cerro El Pital
Guatemala: Antigua Guatemala, Cobán, Fraijanes, Quetzaltenango
Haiti: Kenscoff  
Honduras: La Esperanza, Santa Rosa de Copán, Siguatepeque
Jamaica: Blue Mountains
Mexico: Almost all of the northern part (Culiacán and Los Cabos are tropical) and some other highland areas including the Mexican Plateau. Major cities include Aguascalientes City, Ciudad Juárez, Guadalajara, Hermosillo, León, Matamoros, Mexicali, Mexico City, Monterrey, Puebla, Querétaro City, Reynosa, San Luis Potosí City, Tijuana, and Torreón. Also Ciudad Constitución, Ciudad Victoria, Durango City, Guanajuato City, La Paz, Morelia, Pachuca, Saltillo, Tepic, Tlaxcala City, Toluca, Xalapa, and Zacatecas City.
Nicaragua: Mogotón
Panama: Cerro Punta
Paraguay: southern areas including Asunción and Ciudad del Este
Peru: Arequipa, Cajamarca, Chachapoyas, Cusco, Lima, Trujillo
United States: East Coast from the southern Delmarva Peninsula to Florida (but not including tropical South Florida, Everglades, and the Florida Keys),  Gulf Coast, parts of the inland South and Southwest, and the West Coast from San Diego to northern California and coastal southern Oregon. Major cities: Atlanta; Austin; Baltimore; Birmingham ; Charlotte; Dallas; El Paso ; Fresno, CA ; Greensboro, NC ; Greenville, SC ; Houston; Jacksonville; Las Vegas ; Los Angeles;  Memphis; Nashville ; New Orleans; Norfolk; Oklahoma City ; Orlando; Phoenix ; Raleigh; Richmond, VA ; Riverisde, CA ; Sacramento ; San Antonio; San Diego; San Francisco; San Jose; Tampa; Tucson ; Tulsa ; Washington, D.C..  The humid subtropical zone of the US South according to Trewartha is coloured yellow-green on this map:  If using the Köppen climate classification with the 0°C coldest-month isotherm, the subtropics extend from Martha's Vineyard, extreme SW Rhode Island, areas of coastal Connecticut, and the majority of Long Island to central Florida in the east, include the southern tier of the Midwest, and extend as far north as the Columbia Valley of SE Washington in the inland west. Under this definition Boise, Cincinnati, Denver, Harrisburg, and St. Louis are borderline and Walla Walla, Washington is Csa.
Uruguay: All
Venezuela: Mérida , Mucuchíes

Europe
Only in Trewartha's classification.
Borderline.
Borderline only in Trewartha's classification.

Albania: Durrës, Elbasan, Shkodër, Tirana, Vlorë
Bosnia and Herzegovina: Coastal strip including Neum, Mostar 
Bulgaria: Sozopol, Sunny Beach, Tsarevo, Varna
Crimea: Yalta (disputed between Russia and Ukraine)
Croatia: Dubrovnik, Pula, Rijeka , Split, Zadar
France: Ajaccio, Avignon, Belle Île, Biarritz, Bordeaux, Cannes, Île d'Yeu, La Rochelle, Lourdes, Marseille, Montpellier, Narbonne , Nice, Nîmes, Noirmoutier, Perpignan, Toulon, Toulouse, Ushant
Gibraltar
Greece: Athens, Corfu, Heraklion, Larissa, Patras, Thessaloniki
Italy: Bari, Cagliari, Capri , Elba, Florence, Genoa, Livorno, Naples, Palermo, Pescara, Pisa, Rome, Taranto, Trieste
Malta: Birkirkara, Valletta
Monaco
Montenegro: Bar, Podgorica
Portugal: Azores, Braga, Coimbra, Faro, Lisbon, Porto
Russia: Sochi and Tuapse on the coast of Krasnodar Krai
San Marino (lower areas are borderline)
Slovenia: Koper
Spain: A Coruña, Alicante, Almería, Balearic Islands, Barcelona, Bilbao, Cádiz, Córdoba, Gijón, Granada, Huesca, Logroño, Madrid, Málaga, Mérida, Murcia, San Sebastián, Santander, Seville, Toledo, Valencia, Vigo, Zaragoza
United Kingdom: Coastal Cornwall and the Isles of Scilly , Bailiwick of Guernsey , Jersey 
Vatican City

Oceania
Only in Trewartha's classification.
Borderline.
Which borders on a fully tropical climate.

Australia: New South Wales (though not most of the Tablelands and Highland regions), Jervis Bay Territory, lower elevations of Australian Capital Territory (Canberra is borderline only in Trewartha's classification), parts of Queensland and Western Australia, most of South Australia and Victoria, and Alice Springs in the Northern Territory. Major cities in Australia include Sydney, Melbourne , Perth, Brisbane, and Adelaide. Also Lord Howe Island and Norfolk Island in the Pacific; coastal Tasmania including Hobart  and Launceston ; and Mount Isa  and Rockhampton , Queensland.
New Zealand: Using the Trewartha climate classification: The north and coastal regions of the North Island including the Auckland, Northland, and Bay of Plenty regions and Wellington . Also Blenheim , Hokitika , Nelson , Okarito , and Westport  in the South Island; the Kermadec Islands to the NE of the North Island; and the Chatham Islands  to the east of the South Island. Using the Köppen climate classification, New Zealand has an oceanic climate except for the Kermadecs, which are humid subtropical.
Areas of the New Guinea Highlands including Wabag, Papua New Guinea and the Jayawijaya Mountains in Indonesia
Polynesia: Bass Islands, French Polynesia ; Easter Island; highlands of the Hawaiian Islands; Adamstown, Pitcairn Islands (Pitcairn beaches are tropical)

Southern Indian Ocean 
These French overseas territories have a marine subtropical climate according to Trewartha's classification:
Île Amsterdam 
Île Saint-Paul

References

Subtropical
Subtropical
Subtropical